Ōhiwa is a rural settlement in the Ōpōtiki District and Bay of Plenty Region of New Zealand's North Island. It is on a headland on the eastern side of Ōhiwa Harbour, and on the western side of the Waiotahe River mouth.

The New Zealand Geographic Board officially included the macron in the name from 16 July 2020.

The Ferry Hotel was opened at Ōhiwa in 1873, together with a ferry service to Ōhope. A post office opened in the growing town in 1877. Unstable sand and erosion from 1915 destroyed the town. A second attempt to create sections for baches in the 1960s was also lost to erosion in 1978.

Onekawa Te Mawhai Regional Park was created on the headland in 2010. It incorporates areas of archaeological importance from long Māori use of the area, including Onekawa pā. 

A local campground provides accommodation.

Demographics
It is part of the wider Waiotahi statistical area.

Ōhiwa had a population of 171 at the 2018 New Zealand census, an increase of 15 people (9.6%) since the 2013 census, and a decrease of 6 people (−3.4%) since the 2006 census. There were 69 households, comprising 84 males and 93 females, giving a sex ratio of 0.9 males per female. The median age was 55.6 years (compared with 37.4 years nationally), with 27 people (15.8%) aged under 15 years, 15 (8.8%) aged 15 to 29, 87 (50.9%) aged 30 to 64, and 48 (28.1%) aged 65 or older.

Ethnicities were 89.5% European/Pākehā, 24.6% Māori, and 1.8% Asian. People may identify with more than one ethnicity.

Although some people chose not to answer the census's question about religious affiliation, 61.4% had no religion, 28.1% were Christian, 7.0% had Māori religious beliefs, 1.8% were Hindu and 3.5% had other religions.

Of those at least 15 years old, 42 (29.2%) people had a bachelor's or higher degree, and 15 (10.4%) people had no formal qualifications. The median income was $32,900, compared with $31,800 nationally. 27 people (18.8%) earned over $70,000 compared to 17.2% nationally. The employment status of those at least 15 was that 69 (47.9%) people were employed full-time, 18 (12.5%) were part-time, and 6 (4.2%) were unemployed.

References

Ōpōtiki District
Populated places in the Bay of Plenty Region